Trumpler 3 is an open cluster located in the constellation Cassiopeia. It has the visual magnitude of 7 and is one of the most famous star clusters in the Trumpler catalogue.

It has two bright stars, TYC 4053-658-1 and TYC 4053-466-1 of apparent magnitudes 10.16 and 10.02, respectively.

References

External links
 

Open clusters
Cassiopeia (constellation)
Trumpler catalog